Cowboys is a 2013 Croatian comedy film directed by Tomislav Mršić and based upon Sasa Anočić's play, Kauboji. It was selected as the Croatian entry for the Best Foreign Language Film at the 87th Academy Awards, but was not nominated.

Cast
 Saša Anočić as Saša Anloković
 Živko Anočić as Domagoj Strbac
 Matija Antolić as Juraj Krmpotić
 Hrvoje Barišić as Javor Borovec
 Ana Begić as Saša's sister
 Nikša Butijer as Post office clerk
 Nina Erak-Svrtan as Javor's mother
 Kruno Klobučar as Bruno Marić
 Ivana Rushaidat as Marica Krmpotić
 Rakan Rushaidat as Miodrag P. Osmanović
 Radovan Ruždjak as Ivan Horvat

See also
 List of submissions to the 87th Academy Awards for Best Foreign Language Film
 List of Croatian submissions for the Academy Award for Best Foreign Language Film

References

External links
 

2013 films
2013 comedy films
2013 directorial debut films
Croatian comedy films
2010s Croatian-language films
Croatian films based on plays
Films based on works by Croatian writers